Ochyorsky (masculine), Ochyorskaya (feminine), or Ochyorskoye (neuter) may refer to:
Ochyorsky District, a district of Perm Krai, Russia
Ochyorskoye Urban Settlement, a municipal formation which the town of Ochyor in Ochyorsky District of Perm Krai, Russia is incorporated as